Overstolz is a German cigarette brand manufactured by Japan Tobacco International.

History
Overstolz was originally manufactured by the former Cologne cigarette company Haus Neuerburg. The brand is named after the Cologne patrician of Overstolzen and has been protected since 1917. In the 1960s, the German actor Heinz Engelmann (known from the police procedural television series Stahlnetz) was the advertising face of the cigarette brand, for which he made various newspaper and television adverts. In 2014, Overstolz cigarettes are manufactured by Japan Tobacco international in Trier. Since May 2015, the brand is no longer available on the normal market, however they are still available in online tobacco shops, but are only sold in 10-packs.

Products
 Overstolz Filter

Below are all the current brands of Overstolz cigarettes sold, with the levels of tar, nicotine and carbon monoxide included.

See also
 Cigarette
 Tobacco smoking

External links
 Overstolz (Packungsbilder)

References

Japan Tobacco brands
Cigarettes
1917 establishments in Germany
2015 disestablishments in Germany